Raidah is an Arabic word meaning leader or pioneer, sometimes used as a personal name.
It can also refer to:
Raydah, a community in Yemen
al-Raida, a quarterly peer-reviewed feminist academic journal covering women's and gender studies
Da Raidahs, a nickname for the Las Vegas Raiders, an American football team